English Australians, also known as Anglo-Australians, are Australians whose ancestry originates wholly or partly in England. In the 2021 census, 8,385,928 people, or 33% of the Australian population, stated that they had English ancestry (whether sole or partial). It is the largest self-identified ancestry in Australia. People of ethnic English origin have been the largest group to migrate to Australia since the establishment of the Colony of New South Wales in 1788.

English Australians are a subset of Anglo-Celtic Australians, who are themselves a subset of European Australians. Other subsets of Anglo-Celtic Australians (that is, Australians with ancestry originating in the British Isles) include Irish Australians, Scottish Australians and Welsh Australians. There is a tendency to refer to these ancestries collectively due to their long history in Australia and the high degree of intermixture which has occurred over centuries. In light of this history, there is a tendency for Australians with English or other Anglo-Celtic ancestries to simply identify their ancestry as 'Australian'.

History

18th and 19th centuries

New South Wales was established in 1788 by the British government as a penal colony. Visitors described the English character of Sydney for at least the first 50 years after 1788, noting the traditional English appearance of the churches overlooking the convict barracks. First-generation colonial Sydney residents were predominantly English. 160,000 convicts came to Australia between 1788 and 1850. Between 1788 and 1840, 80,000 English convicts were transported to New South Wales, with the greatest numbers coming between 1825 and 1835. The New South Wales Census of 1846 accounted for 57,349 born in England, 47,547 born in Ireland and 14,406 born in Scotland. Until 1859, 2.2 million (73%) of the free settlers who immigrated were British in origin.

Many more English people immigrated to Victoria by the gold rush of the 1850s. By 1854 there were 97,943 English-born people in Victoria. Immigration policies and assistance schemes helped maintain high levels of immigration from England. Of the 1 million immigrants who arrived between 1860 and 1900, just over half came from England.

Between 1840 and 1870 there were more Irish than English assisted migrants which did not change until the 1870s, when there were more English.

At least 75 per cent of all overseas-born people in Australia during the 19th century were from the British Isles. The proportion who had been born in England or Wales remained quite stable (at about 47 per cent) from 1861 to 1911, as did the proportion born in
Scotland (about 12 per cent).

English settlers more often came from the South than the North of England.

Post-Federation English immigration

Australians of English ancestry made up more than 50 per cent of the population at the time of Federation (1901). From 1922 the Empire Settlement Act assisted thousands of migrants from England. After the Second World War, even as immigration from other countries expanded dramatically, English citizens had almost unrestricted entry into Australia. Arthur Calwell, Minister for Immigration, wanted nine out of ten new immigrants to be UK-born. The majority of England-born migrants received assisted passages until the scheme was abolished in 1982.

Among the notable English-born were politicians such as Henry Parkes, and Joseph Cook; in retailing and media: John Norton, Anthony Hordern and John Fairfax.

Surges of English immigration in the 1910s, 1920s, 1950s and 1960s sustained the English-born as the largest single immigrant group throughout the 20th century. In 1978 Australians of predominantly English ancestry made up over 45 per cent of the population. English ancestry was reported by 6.6 million people (46%) in 1986, and 6.4 million (37%) in 2001. While the English-born continue to be well-represented among immigrants to Australia, the overall decline of English immigration to Australia since the 1980s has meant that the English-born are declining as a proportion of immigrants to Australia. Regardless, Australian society continues to be influenced by its strong English heritage.

Demographics
In the 2021 census, 8,385,928 people, or 33% of the Australian population, stated that they had English ancestry (whether wholly or partial).

Cultural influence
People of English descent were by far the single most influential ethnic group in colonial Australia. The founding of Australia by English people is still evident in place names, Australia's common law legal system, popular dishes such as fish and chips and English as Australia's national language.

In Sydney, at least 50 suburban names are derived directly from 20 English counties, of which the largest numbers are from Kent, Surrey and London. Among the best known are Surry Hills, Croydon, Hornsby, Epping, Chipping Norton, Brighton-le-Sands, Bexley, Canterbury, Ryde, Kensington, Lewisham and Penshurst.

Notable people

English convicts transported to Australia

Prime Ministers

The majority of Prime Ministers of Australia have been of at least partial English ancestry. To date all Australian Prime Ministers have had whole or partial Anglo-Celtic ancestry.

Edmund Barton, 1st Prime Minister, 1901–1903 (English parents)
Alfred Deakin, 2nd Prime Minister, 1903–1904, 1905–08, 1909–10 (English parents)
Joseph Cook, 6th Prime Minister, 1913–1914 (born in Silverdale, Staffordshire, England)
Billy Hughes, 7th Prime Minister, 1915–1923 (born in London, England)
Earle Page, 11th Prime Minister, 1939 (father from London, England)
Robert Menzies, 12th Prime Minister, 1939–1941, 1949-66 (maternal grandparents born in Penzance, England) 
Harold Holt, 17th Prime Minister, 1966–1967 (English descent) 
John McEwen, 18th Prime Minister, 1967–1968 (partial English descent)
John Gorton, 19th Prime Minister, 1968–1971 (English father)
William McMahon, 20th Prime Minister, 1971–1972 (partial English descent) 
Gough Whitlam, 21st Prime Minister, 1972–1975 (English descent)
Malcolm Fraser, 22nd Prime Minister, 1975–1983 (partial English descent)
Bob Hawke, 23rd Prime Minister, 1983–1991 (English descent; all great-grandparents born in England, seven from Cornwall, England and one from Cheshire, England) 
Paul Keating, 24th Prime Minister, 1991–1996 (maternal English descent) 
John Howard, 25th Prime Minister, 1996–2007 (partial English descent) 
Kevin Rudd, 26th Prime Minister, 2007–10, 2013 (his 4th great-grandparents, convicts Thomas Rudd from London and Mary Cable from Essex, England)
Julia Gillard, 27th Prime Minister, 2010–2013 (paternal grandparents born in England) 
Tony Abbott, 28th Prime Minister, 2013–2015 (English father; born in London, England of English, Dutch, Scottish and Welsh descent)
Malcolm Turnbull, 29th Prime Minister, 2015–2018 (maternal grandmother, May Lansbury (née Morle), born in England)
Scott Morrison, 30th Prime Minister, 2018 (English ancestry)

See also

 Demographics of Australia
 Anglo-Celtic Australians
 European Australians
 White people#Australia
 Irish Australians
 Scottish Australians
 Welsh Australians
 English diaspora
 English Americans
 English Canadians
 European New Zealanders
 Immigration to Australia
 English New Zealanders
 List of locations in Australia with an English name

References

Further reading
 Haines, Robin F. Emigration and the labouring poor: Australian recruitment in Britain and Ireland, 1831–60 (Springer, 1997).

 Richards, Eric. Britannia's children: emigration from England, Scotland, Wales and Ireland since 1600 (A&C Black, 2004) online.
 Richards, Eric. "How did poor people emigrate from the British Isles to Australia in the nineteenth century?" Journal of British Studies 32.3 (1993): 250-279. online

External links
  (English in Sydney) [CC-By-SA] 

European Australian
 
Immigration to Australia
 
Ethnic groups in Australia